Qillwa Quta (Aymara qillwa, qiwña, qiwlla Andean gull, quta lake, "gull lake", also spelled Kellhuacota) is a mountain in the eastern extensions of the Apolobamba mountain range in Bolivia, about  high. It is situated in the La Paz Department, Bautista Saavedra Province, Curva Municipality.

References 

Mountains of La Paz Department (Bolivia)